To the Death may refer to:
"To the Death" (Star Trek: Deep Space Nine), a 1996 Star Trek: Deep Space Nine episode
To the Death (M.O.P. album), 1994
To the Death (Earth Crisis album), 2009
To the Death (1917 film), a 1917 silent film
To the Death (1993 film), a 1993 South African martial arts film
To the Death (audio drama), a Doctor Who audio drama